Thomas Muirhead may refer to:

Tommy Muirhead (1897–1979), Scottish footballer born Thomas Muirhead
Thomas Muirhead (curler) (born 1995), Scottish curler
Thomas Muirhead Flett (1923–1976), Scottish mathematician